Coranus elegans is a species of assassin bug in the sub family Harpactorinae. It is found in Africa.

References

External links 

 Coranus elegans at Biolib

Reduviidae
Insects described in 1952
Taxa named by Henri Schouteden